Reno Beach is a census-designated place (CDP) in Lucas County, Ohio, United States, on the southwest shore of Lake Erie. It contains the unincorporated communities of Lakemont Landing, Reno Beach, Lakeland, and Howard Farms Beach (from west to east) and was first listed as a CDP prior to the 2020 census.

The CDP is in eastern Lucas County, in Jerusalem Township.

Demographics

References 

Census-designated places in Lucas County, Ohio
Census-designated places in Ohio